List of Scottish loch-monsters is a list of lochs in Scotland said to contain monsters in Scottish folklore.

See also
 List of lake monsters

References

Loch-monsters